Mimomulciber strandiellus is a species of beetle in the family Cerambycidae, and the only species in the genus Mimomulciber. It was described by Breuning in 1942.

References

Desmiphorini
Beetles described in 1942
Monotypic beetle genera